ITU-R P.525 is the International Telecommunication Union radiocommunications standard for the calculation of free-space attenuation.

See also
Free space loss

ITU-R recommendations